Pat "Fagan" Cronin is an Irish retired hurler who played as a right wing-forward for the Clare senior team.

Honours

Munster
Railway Cup (1): 1968

References

Living people
Newmarket-on-Fergus hurlers
Clare inter-county hurlers
Munster inter-provincial hurlers
Year of birth missing (living people)